Neudo Ribeiro Campos (born September 1, 1946) is a Brazilian engineer and politician. He was governor of Roraima from 1995 to 2002. He is affiliated with the Progressive Party (Brazil). Elected federal deputy for the PP in 2006, he resigned in August 2010 in a ploy to send the first instance the final judgment of a criminal case known as the "locust scandal".

References

Living people
1946 births
Governors of Roraima
Members of the Chamber of Deputies (Brazil) from Roraima
Progressistas politicians
People from Boa Vista, Roraima
Brazilian engineers